Rancher is a ghost town in Treasure County, Montana, United States.

Notable person
Grace Eldering, public health scientist, was born in Rancher.

Notes

Geography of Treasure County, Montana
Ghost towns in Montana